Seijin (written: 誠人 or 誠仁) is a masculine Japanese given name. Notable people with the name include:

, Japanese musician and singer
, Japanese motorcycle racer

Japanese masculine given names